Labeobarbus latirostris is a species of ray-finned fish in the genus Labeobarbus which is found in the Lake Malawi basin in Africa.

References 

 

latirostris
Fish described in 1908